"Forever's as Far as I'll Go" is a song written by Mike Reid, and recorded by American country music group Alabama.  It was released in October 1990 as the third single from the album Pass It On Down.  The song was Alabama's twenty-ninth number one country hit.  The single went to number one for one week and spent a total of twenty weeks on the country chart.

Chart performance

Year-end charts

References

1990 songs
1990 singles
Alabama (American band) songs
Songs written by Mike Reid (singer)
Song recordings produced by Josh Leo
RCA Records Nashville singles